The 2000 Sam Houston State Bearkats football team represented Sam Houston State University as a member of the Southland Football League during the 2000 NCAA Division I-AA football season. Led by 19th-year head coach Ron Randleman, the Bearkats compiled an overall record of 7–4 with a mark of 4–3 in conference play, and finished fourth in the Southland.

Schedule

References

Sam Houston State
Sam Houston Bearkats football seasons
Sam Houston State Bearkats football